Dhekelia Power Station is one of three power plants belonging to the Electricity Authority of Cyprus.

History
The original plant was the first of the company, which started building it in the mid-1950s. Completed, it consisted of seven steam turbo generators with a total capacity of 84 MW. As the machinery grew old and demand rose steadily, a new plant was built next to the old.

Built in five phases, the current power plant consists of six steam turbines, each of a capacity of 60 MW and six diesel engines of approximately 17 MW each. All boilers burn heavy fuel oil and were built by Waagner-Biro. The first two turbines and generators were supplied by Siemens and came online in 1982 and 1983. Turbines 3 and 4 were made by Toshiba and the corresponding generators by Alstom and came online in 1986. The steam plant was completed with the supply of turbogenerators 5 and 6 from Bharat Heavy Electricals in 1992 and 1993.

The original plant was demolished in the early 2000s.

See also

 Energy in Cyprus

References

Oil-fired power stations in Cyprus
Enclaves and exclaves